Euro is an abandoned town in the Goldfields-Esperance region of Western Australia, located about 7 kms from Laverton.

The town was named after a gold mine established by North Star Gold Mines Ltd., although Euro is also a name for the common wallaby.

References

Ghost towns in Western Australia
Shire of Laverton